"The Titanic" (also known as "It Was Sad When That Great Ship Went Down" and "Titanic (Husbands and Wives)") is a folk song and children's song. "The Titanic" is about the sinking of RMS Titanic which sank on April 15, 1912, after striking an iceberg.

Background

History
The first folk songs about the Titanic disaster appeared within weeks after the disaster. Recordings of various songs about the disaster date to as early as 1913.

Variants
The canonical version of the song has the chorus:

In most variants, although not the earliest, the chorus starts with a line "it was sad, so sad, it was sad", and in many versions, the line "to the bottom of the..." appended after the repeat of "went down."  Other than the chorus, different versions may contain verses in different order.

There are several regional variations on the song. According to Newman I. White's 1928 book American Negro Folk-Songs, "The Titanic" has been traced back to 1915 or 1916 in Hackleburg, Alabama. Other versions from around 1920 are documented in the Frank C. Brown Collection at Duke University in North Carolina. Early recordings include Ernest Stoneman's "The Titanic" (Okeh 40288) in September 1924 and William and Versey Smith's "When That Great Ship Went Down" in August 1927.

According to Jeff Place, in his notes for the Anthology of American Folk Music:  "African-American musicians, in particular, found it noteworthy and ironic that company policies had kept Blacks from the doomed ship; the sinking was also attributed by some to divine retribution."

Recordings
 William and Versey Smith on Anthology of American Folk Music, Smithsonian Folkways 1952
 Bessie Jones on The Alan Lomax Collection Sampler Rounder 1997
 Woody Guthrie on The Asch Recordings, Vol. 1: This Land Is Your Land, Smithsonian Folkways 1999
 Pert Near Sandstone on "Paradise hop" version called "sad when the great bridge came down" 2011
 Ernest Stoneman on The Face That Never Returned / The Sinking of the Titanic (singles) 1924
 Mance Lipscomb on Texas Songster Volume 2 (You Got to Reap What You Sow) 1964 
 Pete Seeger on Headlines and Footnotes: A Collection of Topical Songs, Smithsonian Folkways 1999
 Freakwater on Dancing Underwater, Amoeba Records 1991 / Thrill Jockey 1997
 Tom Glazer on The Ballad of Namu the Killer Whale, United Artists 1965

In popular culture
"The Titanic" was sung by Paul Newman and Brandon de Wilde's characters after a drunken night out, in the 1963 film Hud.

References

Works cited

External links
 - Lyrics on Scoutorama website.
 - Lyrics with "Uncles and aunts, little children lost their pants" variation.
"The Sinking Of The Titanic" – Music and lyrics.

American folk songs
American children's songs
Songs about the RMS Titanic
Lead Belly songs
1915 songs
1925 singles